Senhora dos Remédios is a Brazilian municipality located in the state of Minas Gerais. The city belongs to the mesoregion of Campo das Vertentes and to the microregion of Barbacena.  In 2020, the estimated population was 10,467.

See also
 List of municipalities in Minas Gerais

References

Municipalities in Minas Gerais